Zéphire (or Zéphyre) is an opera by Jean-Philippe Rameau in the form of a one-act acte de ballet. Nothing is known about the date of its composition and in all likelihood it was probably not performed in Rameau's lifetime. The name of its librettist is also unknown but may possibly have been Louis de Cahusac.

The first known performance of Zéphire did not take place until modern times when it was performed  on 15 June 1967 at the Jubilee Hall in Aldeburgh, Suffolk, England.

Roles

Synopsis
Scene: A forest with an altar to Diana

Zephyrus, the god of the west wind, is in love with Chloris, one of the nymphs of Diana. As the nymphs approach, he hides himself in the foliage. The nymphs celebrate the return of the dawn (Chorus: "Chantons le retour de l'aurore") and reget the absence of Diana herself (Chorus: "Ô Diane, pourquoi vous séparer de nous?"). They deck Diana's altar with floral  wreaths. As Chloris is about to leave, Zephyrus stops her, makes flowers magically appear beneath her footsteps and declares his love for her. Chloris is reluctant to trust his flattery, believing he is the mischievous god Cupid in disguise.  As the other nymphs return, Zephyrus commands his followers, the zephyrs, to charm them in the guise of young men while he continues to woo Chloris. He asks Cupid to break the laws of chastity which Diana has ordered her nymphs to follow (Air: "Vole, Amour, brise leur chaíne"). The nymphs dance with the zephyrs but their pleasure is interrupted by the sound of a horn, signalling the arrival of Diana. They fear her anger, but Diana admits she too has fallen in love with the shepherd Endymion. She confesses the power of Cupid and frees them from their vows of chastity. Zephyrus and Chloris sing of their love for one another (Duet: "Qu'il est doux de suivre") and Zephyrus transforms her into Flora, the goddess of Spring. Cupid appears and everyone celebrates his triumph (Duet and chorus: "Amour, sois le dieu de nos âmes").

Recordings
Zéphyre, sung by Philip Langridge (Zéphyre), Michèle Pena (Cloris), Isabel Garcisanz (Diane) with Maîtrise Gabriel Fauré, Choeur Elizabeth Brasseur, & Ensemble Instrumental de France conducted by Jean-Pierre Wallez, IPG 7465, 1976 (1LP).
La Guirlande & Zéphyre, sung by Gaëlle Méchaly (Zéphyre), Rebecca Ockenden (Cloris / Flore), Sophie Decaudaveine (Diane) with Cappella Coloniensis des WDR, & Les Arts Florissants conducted by William Christie, Erato 8573-85774-2, 2000 (2CD).

References
Sources
Girdlestone, Cuthbert, Jean-Philippe Rameau: His Life and Work, New York: Dover, 1969  (paperback edition)
Holden, Amanda (Ed.), The New Penguin Opera Guide, New York: Penguin Putnam, 2001. 
Sadler, Graham, (Ed.), The New Grove French Baroque Masters  Grove/Macmillan, 1988

External links
Rameau le site, a site dedicated to Jean-Philippe Rameau (in both French and English)

Operas
Operas by Jean-Philippe Rameau
French-language operas
One-act operas
18th-century operas
Operas based on classical mythology
Ballets by Jean-Philippe Rameau